Frank Willis Wheeler (March 2, 1853 – August 9, 1921) was a shipbuilder and politician from the U.S. state of Michigan.

Biography
Wheeler was born in Chaumont, New York attended the common schools.  In 1864, he moved with his parents to East Saginaw, Michigan and attended the Saginaw High School and the Ypsilanti State Normal School (now (Eastern Michigan University).  He engaged in boatbuilding and moved to West Bay City in 1876.  He became master of the Saginaw River Tug Association and engaged in shipbuilding at the Bay Cities for many years.

In 1888, Wheeler was the Republican candidate for the U.S. House of Representatives from Michigan's 10th congressional district and defeated incumbent Democrat Spencer O. Fisher to be elected to the 51st Congress. Wheeler served from March 4, 1889 to March 3, 1891 and was not a candidate for reelection in 1890.

After leaving Congress, Wheeler engaged in his former pursuits until 1899, when he moved to Detroit.  He returned to Saginaw in 1917 and organized the Saginaw Shipbuilding Co. and was engaged in building boats for the United States Government.

Frank W. Wheeler died in Saginaw and is interred in Elm Lawn Cemetery, Bay City, Michigan.

References

Frank W. Wheeler at The Political Graveyard

1853 births
1921 deaths
Burials in Michigan
Eastern Michigan University alumni
People from Jefferson County, New York
People from Bay City, Michigan
People from Saginaw, Michigan
Republican Party members of the United States House of Representatives from Michigan
19th-century American politicians